Seneca County is the name of two counties in the United States:

 Seneca County, New York
 Seneca County, Ohio